Lechenaultia superba, commonly known as Barrens leschenaultia, is a species of flowering plant in the family Goodeniaceae and is endemic to near-coastal areas of southern Western Australia. It is an erect, spreading shrub with crowded, narrow, fleshy leaves and yellow, red, or yellow and orange flowers.

Description
The flowers are arranged singly on the ends of branchlets and are yellow, red, or yellow and orange.

Taxonomy
Lechenaultia superba was first formally described in 1867 by Ferdinand von Mueller in his Fragmenta Phytographiae Australiae from specimens collected near the Phillips River. The specific epithet (superba) means "splendid".

Distribution and habitat
This leschenaultia grows in scrub on rocky hillsides near East Mount Barren in the Esperance Plains biogeographic region.

Conservation status
Barrens leschenaultia is listed as "Priority Four" by the Government of Western Australia Department of Biodiversity, Conservation and Attractions, meaning that it is rare or near threatened.

References

Asterales of Australia
superba
Eudicots of Western Australia
Plants described in 1867
Taxa named by Ferdinand von Mueller